The Emirates National Auto Museum is a national automobile museum in the Emirate of Abu Dhabi, United Arab Emirates.

The museum has a collection of around 200 cars belonging to Sheikh Hamad bin Hamdan Al Nahyan in a pyramid shaped building.

Hamad bin Hamdan Al Nahyan's collection holds several world records including the largest collection of 4x4 vehicles at 718, the largest caravan at 122 tons with 8 bedrooms and the worlds largest motorised model car a 4 to 1 drivable scale replica Willys Jeep. The collection also includes a wide range of military vehicles, classic American cars, a Mercedes "rainbow" collection of different coloured cars, an 1885 steam-powered Mercedes .

3 items from the collection were used during Season 21 Episode 4 of the BBC television programme Top Gear. These were the 20 foot tall Willys Jeep, a modified 8x8 Nissan Patrol and a Mercedes Benz Monster Truck

References

External links
 

Museums with year of establishment missing
Museums in Abu Dhabi
Automobile museums in the United Arab Emirates
National museums of the United Arab Emirates